Minas Stavridis (born 1945) is a Greek former professional footballer who played as midfielder and a former manager.

Club career
Stavridis started football at the local Aris Nikias, where he competed in the second division. In 1965 with the merger of Aris with AE Nikaias he moved to the then newly founded team of Ionikos, where he was a key member and distinguished himself. The AEK Athens defender, Tasos Vasiliou who was also a former player of Ionikos, indicated to the people of AEK the signing of Stavridis. After the transfer deal between the two teams was completed, the adviser of Ionikos, Dasmanoglou made a last-ditch effort to scuttle the transfer by acting on behalf of Olympiacos, who were also interested in the player. Stavridis, being a fan of AEK and coming from a family who were also supporters of the club, refused any step backs and moved to the yellow-blacks in the summer of 1968. He played there for 2 seasons, failing to establish himself in the squad, mainly due to a bad relationship with the coach Branko Stanković and competed mainly in friendly matches. Nevertheless, with AEK he reaced to the quarter-finals of the European Cup in 1969.

In the summer of 1970, he transferred to Vyzas Megara, where he played for 3 seasons in the second division. In the summer of 1973 he returned to Ionikos, playing for 3 seasons before his retirement as a footballer.

Managerial career
After his retirement from as a football player, Stavridis was involved in coaching. He was a coach in various clubs of Piraeus, while for years he was a coach of the infrastructure departments of Ionikos.

References

1945 births
Living people
Greek footballers
Super League Greece players
Super League Greece 2 players
Ionikos F.C. players
AEK Athens F.C. players
Vyzas F.C. players
Association football midfielders
Footballers from Piraeus